Aben is an unincorporated community in Ascension Parish, Louisiana, United States. Louisiana Highway 18 passes through the community.

References

Unincorporated communities in Ascension Parish, Louisiana
Unincorporated communities in Louisiana